USS Mobile was a  light cruiser of the United States Navy, which were built during World War II. The class was designed as a development of the earlier s, the size of which had been limited by the First London Naval Treaty. The start of the war led to the dissolution of the treaty system, but the dramatic need for new vessels precluded a new design, so the Clevelands used the same hull as their predecessors, but were significantly heavier. The Clevelands carried a main battery of twelve  guns in four three-gun turrets, along with a secondary armament of twelve  dual-purpose guns.

She was laid down on 14 April 1941 by Newport News Shipbuilding and Dry Dock Co., Newport News, Virginia; launched on 15 May 1942; sponsored by Mrs. Harry T. Hartwell; and commissioned on 24 March 1943, Captain Charles J. Wheeler in command.

Design

Following the start of World War II in September 1939, Britain announced it would suspend the treaty for the duration of the conflict, a decision the US Navy quickly followed. Though still neutral, the United States recognized that war was likely and the urgent need for additional ships ruled out an entirely new design, so the Clevelands were a close development of the earlier s, the chief difference being the substitution of a two-gun  dual-purpose gun mount for one of the main battery  gun turrets.

The ship was powered by four General Electric steam turbines, each driving one propeller shaft, using steam provided by four oil-fired Babcock & Wilcox boilers. Her crew numbered 1285 officers and enlisted men.

The ship was armed with a main battery of twelve 6 in /47 caliber Mark 16 guns in four 3-gun turrets on the centerline. Two were placed forward in a superfiring pair; the other two turrets were placed aft of the superstructure in another superfiring pair. The secondary battery consisted of twelve  /38 caliber dual-purpose guns mounted in twin turrets. Two of these were placed on the centerline, one directly behind the forward main turrets and the other just forward of the aft turrets. Two more were placed abreast of the conning tower and the other pair on either side of the aft superstructure. Anti-aircraft defense consisted of twenty-eight Bofors  guns in four quadruple and six double mounts and twenty-one Oerlikon  guns in single mounts.

The main battery turrets were protected with  faces and  sides and tops, and they were supported by barbettes 6 inches thick. Mobiles conning tower had 5-inch sides.

Service history

World War II

1943
Following a Chesapeake Bay shakedown and a brief training cruise to Casco Bay, Mobile departed for the Pacific, arriving Pearl Harbor on 23 July 1943 for a month of further training. On 22 August, she sailed west, joining Task Force 15 (TF 15) the following day for a raid on Marcus Island on 31 August. She participated in two more carrier raids from Hawaii before joining the 5th Fleet for the Gilberts campaign. She screened the ships of TF 15 as they struck at Tarawa Atoll on 18 September, and the ships of TF 14 hitting Wake on 5–6 October. On 21 October, she sailed west again in Task Group 53.3 (TG 53.3). By 8 November, she was off Bougainville Island covering reinforcement landings. Thence she steamed to Espiritu Santo, where she joined TG 53.7 for the assault and occupation of Tarawa. From the landings at Betio on the 20th–28th, she remained in the area supporting the Marine assault forces as they fought the first vigorous beachhead opposition to an American amphibious landing.

On 1 December, Mobile was reassigned to TF 50 (Fast Carrier Forces, Pacific Fleet), the nucleus of what was to become TF 38/58. From the Gilberts, this force moved north for air attacks on Kwajalein and Wotje in the Marshalls. From there, the force returned to Pearl Harbor. Mobile continued on to San Diego, where she arrived and reported for escort duty to Amphibious Forces, 5th Fleet on 29 December.

1944
Fifteen days later, sailing with TG 53.5, she began to make her way back to the Marshalls. Detached on 29 January 1944, Mobile, with other of Cruiser Division 13 (CruDiv 13), bombarded Wotje and then rejoined their task force for the assault and occupation of Kwajalein. Until 6 February, she performed fire support and carrier screening duties off Roi and Namur. She then proceeded to Majuro where, on 12 February, she joined TF 58.

The mission of the fast carrier forces had by this time evolved into sealing off designated enemy-held atolls and islands which the Allies intended to take and interdicting others to isolate and keep to a minimum Japanese resistance at the target. Now a third mission was to be added, the pounding of major enemy bases without the aid of land-based aircraft, leaving little or no need for a return visit. Thus, to ease the occupation of Eniwetok and to aid in the encirclement of Rabaul, TF 58 departed Majuro and sailed for the Carolines. On 16–17 February, they devastated Truk, the best fleet anchorage in the Mandated Territories, the base of the Japanese combined fleet and the center for air and sea communications between Japan and the Bismarck Archipelago. The force then sailed northwest to the Mariana Islands for strikes on Saipan, Tinian, and Guam, encountering heavy aerial resistance there on 21–22 February. After a brief respite for replenishment at Majuro, Mobile sailed to Espiritu Santo, where the ships of TG 58.1 were reorganized as TG 36.1 on 12 March. On 15 March, they steamed northwest to cover Marine forces as they landed on Emirau on 20 March.

Three days later, her group once again became TG 58.1 and readied for further strikes on enemy installations. From 29 March to 3 April, they struck at the Palaus, Yap, and Woleai, returning to Majuro on 5 April. Next they supported Allied landings at Aitape, Humboldt Bay, and Tanah Merah Bay in New Guinea, and bombarded Wakde Airfield and Sawar Airfield on 21–22 April, to neutralize the danger of air attack on the Battle of Hollandia. From there, they returned to the Carolines where they conducted air strikes on Truk and bombarded Satawan on 29–30 April, hit Ponape on 1 May, and then headed back to Majuro to replenish and rearm in preparation for the Marianas campaign.

On 6 June, the carrier force sortied from Majuro again. By 11 June, they were in the Marianas, striking at Saipan, Tinian, Guam, and Rota. From then through 17 June its planes and ships ranged from the Volcano and Bonin Islands to the southernmost Marianas supporting the assault on Saipan and preventing Japanese reinforcements from reaching that beleaguered island and the next target, Guam. On 18 June, searches for a Japanese fleet, reportedly en route from the Philippines, began to the west of the Marianas. The following day the Battle of the Philippine Sea opened with a Japanese carrier-based aircraft attack on the ships covering the Saipan assault.

Retiring from the area on 23 June, the carrier force proceeded to Pagan Island, against which strikes were launched on 24 June, and then made for Eniwetok. Thence, on 30 June, they departed for further strikes on the Bonin and Volcano Islands on 4 July, before turning south once again to continue coverage of the Marianas campaign. Commencing daily strikes on Guam and Rota 6 July, the force remained in the area until after the landings on Guam. On 23 July, TG 58.1, with Mobile  in the inner protective ring, steamed southwest for raids in the Western Carolines. Three days later they pounded Yap, Ulithi, and Fais, while TGs 58.2 and 58.3 hit the Palaus. On 30 July, TF 58 retired to Saipan, arrivingon 2 August.

Underway again the same day, they headed back to the Bonin and Volcano Islands. As carrier planes bombed enemy installations on Iwo, Chichi, Ani, and Haha Jimas on 4 August, Mobile was detached with CruDiv 13 and Destroyer Division 46 (DesDiv 46)) to make an anti-shipping sweep in the Chichi Jima area. In the ensuing hours Mobile assisted in the sinking of one destroyer and a large cargo vessel. The following day she participated in the bombardment of Chichi Jima, and then set course for Eniwetok.

Mobiles fast carrier group, now designated TG 38.3, began with strikes on the Palaus from 6 to 8 September, then sailed west, raiding Mindanao on 9–10 September, and the Visayas, on 12–13 September. On 15 September, the group returned to the Palaus to cover the landings on Peleliu and Angaur. By 18 September the ships of TG 38.3 were headed back to the Philippines. On 21 September, the force's planes struck the Manila area, and on 24 September swept the Visayas again.

The force sortied from Ulithi once again on 6 October to pave the way for the upcoming Philippine operations. Reaching the area, they discovered only one large cargo ship, the other vessel having been disposed of by several of the carrier planes. The three men-of-war quickly sank the cargo ship and rejoined TF 38 for strikes on Formosa and the Pescadores.

Mobile and her companions, playing up erroneous reports issued by the Japanese as to the degree of damage inflicted on "the defeated and fleeing" American force, hoped to draw out the Japanese in chase, so that the carrier task force could destroy them. With the discovery of the waiting American force by Japanese scout planes, orders were changed. Canberra and Houston were towed eastward for repairs and Mobile rejoined TG 38.3 on 17 October.

The next day the force cruised to the east of the northern Philippines and on 20 October guarded the northern air approaches to Leyte as American forces streamed ashore. For the next few days, strikes were conducted throughout the Visayas and on southern Luzon. On 24 October, TG 38.3 was attacked by planes from Vice Admiral Jisaburō Ozawa's Mobile Fleet as they stood by the aircraft carrier . As the Battle for Leyte Gulf raged over the Philippines, TF 38.3 fought in the Battle off Cape Engaño on 25 October, then pursued the Mobile Fleet back toward Japan.

For the next two months, the cruiser continued to operate in support of the Philippine campaign, guarding the carriers as they sent their planes to cover Allied assault forces in the Visayas and on Mindoro. On 26 December, she departed Ulithi for the west coast, arriving 16 days later at Terminal Island California, for overhaul and alterations.

1945
Mobile then joined in the battle of Iwo Jima from 10 February to 10 March 1945. She fired into the hills in Iwo Jima and supported gunfires for the landing operations. Back at Ulithi on 11 March, Mobile reunited with her sister ships Santa Fe and Biloxi. They were going to protect the aircraft carrier USS Franklin (CV-13). On 19 March 1945, Franklin was crippled by 2 bombs and listed. Mobile rushed to the carrier listing side to assist; she lowered her breeches buoys to saved 429 sailors on the ship. After that, Mobile escorted the Franklin back to Ulithi and got repaired. Mobile then escorted the Franklin until the Big Ben reached at Pearl Harbor. After the protection of the Big Ben, her captain was given a medal. Mobile then joined Task Force 95 for minesweeping and patroling in East China Sea on 19 July 1945

Post-War
On 20 August, she cleared San Pedro Bay and headed north toward Okinawa and Japan for duty supporting the occupation. In September, she conducted several cruises between Japan and Okinawa, transporting liberated prisoners of wars on the first leg of their return to the United States. The following month she cruised in the Sasebo area and on 18 November, with Marine Corps and Navy men embarked, she departed for San Diego. Arriving on 2 December, she conducted another "Magic Carpet" run before steaming to Puget Sound for inactivation. Decommissioned on 9 May 1947, she entered the Reserve Fleet at Bremerton and remained there, in reserve, until 1 March 1959 when she was struck from the Naval Vessel Register. She was sold for scrapping to Zidell Explorations, Inc., on 16 December 1959, and was towed away for scrapping on 19 January 1960.

Awards
Mobile received 11 battle stars for her World War II service.

Footnotes

Notes

Citations

References

External links

Cleveland-class cruisers
World War II cruisers of the United States
Ships built in Newport News, Virginia
1942 ships